Joris Trooster (born 18 December 1969) is a Dutch rower. He competed in the men's lightweight coxless four event at the 2000 Summer Olympics.

References

1969 births
Living people
Dutch male rowers
Olympic rowers of the Netherlands
Rowers at the 2000 Summer Olympics
Sportspeople from Utrecht (city)